Labrys  is a genus of bacteria from the family Xanthobacteraceae.

References

Further reading 
 

Hyphomicrobiales
Bacteria genera